South Carolina Gamecocks basketball may refer to either of the basketball teams that represent the University of South Carolina:

South Carolina Gamecocks men's basketball
South Carolina Gamecocks women's basketball